McWay Creek is a  coastal stream in Monterey County in the U.S. state of California. It flows steeply west and south from McWay Canyon, high in California's Central Coast Range, and spills into the Pacific Ocean at Waterfall Cove after flowing over scenic McWay Falls. The creek is named after Christopher McWay  from New York, a pioneer who homesteaded the property.

A Pelton wheel was installed in McWay Creek and generated power for Saddle Rock Ranch, the only electricity in the area for many years. The creek and its canyon are rich in vegetation types, due to the humid coastal climate with frequent fog and rainfall.

Geography

After flowing south and turning slightly in a south-southwest direction, it meets McWay Creek. The creek then heads southwest, passing a parking area for Julia Pfeiffer Burns State Park and crossing under California's Highway 1 via a concrete culvert. It spills into the Pacific Ocean at Waterfall Cove.

There are a number of waterfalls in the basin of McWay Creek. The most well-known is McWay Falls, which spills  onto a sandy beach at Waterfall Cove. A smaller waterfall, the two-tier,  McWay Creek Falls is located upstream of the Highway 1 culvert and the parking area. A small  cascade, Canyon Trail Falls, is fed by the South Fork just before it meets McWay Creek. As most of the creek is steep and rocky, there are many unnamed waterfalls that also exist. McWay Creek is fed by a number of springs in McWay Canyon and flows year round.

History

Christopher McWay homesteaded the canyon named after him in the late 1870s. In 1924, Lathrop and Hélène Hooper Brown purchased the Saddle Rock Ranch totalling 1,600 acres from McWay, and Julia Pfieffer Burns, another Big Sur pioneer, leased land for cattle operations. Hélène became a good friend of Julia until Julia died in 1928. The Browns had a Pelton wheel installed in McWay Creek to generate electricity for the ranch.

Biology
The humid coastal climate of Big Sur and the McWay Canyon area supports a wide variety of vegetation in McWay Canyon. By the coast, the most prominent riparian vegetation consists of willows, alders, western coltsfoot and elk clover, with other species also existing among the dominant plants. Redwood trees also exist in McWay Canyon, but due to salty ocean air, it is said that the ones closer to the shore have not survived healthily. Coastal sage scrub is the dominant ground cover, specked by monkey flowers, Indian paintbrush, common yarrow, blue blossom and coast morning glory.

Upstream, oaks and bay trees begin to take presence. Ground cover consists of mostly sword fern, gooseberry, western wake robin and redwood sorrel. Forest clearings, found near higher elevations, consist of hedge nettle, bracken fern, and wild iris. Redwoods are still prevalent in the upstream areas of the watershed with one rumored to be the largest in the Big Sur area. As elevations increase, live oak, chamise and Coulter pine begin to make presence.

See also
List of rivers of California

References

Works cited
Shaffer, Chris; Bourgo, David; Shaffer, Nicole; Shangle, Joel (2003). The Definitive Guide to the Waterfalls of Southern and Central California. Shafdog Publishing. .
Elliot, Analise (2005). Hiking & Backpacking Big Sur: A Complete Guide to the Trails of Big Sur, Ventana Wilderness, and Silver Peak Wilderness. Wilderness Press. 
Henson, Paul; Usner, Donald J.; Kells, Valerie A (1996). The Natural History of Big Sur. University of California Press. 

Rivers of Monterey County, California
Santa Lucia Range
Monterey Ranger District, Los Padres National Forest
Rivers of Northern California
Big Sur